The Kara River is a river of northern Togo and Benin. It rises in Benin's Donga Department and flows northwest through Kara Region in Togo, including through the town of  Kara, emptying into the Oti River on the Togo-Ghana border. The Kara River Valley Agricultural Development Project is underway in the river valley, protecting about 300 square kilometres.

References

Rivers of Benin
Rivers of Togo
Kara Region
Benin–Togo relations